Shah Suleman Noori Hazoori (also known as "Sakhi Badshah") was a 16th-century scholar, saint and Sufi of Qadiriyya silsila (lineage) in the subcontinent that became modern day Pakistan. His spiritual teacher (murshid) was Shah Maroof Khushabi.

Early life and education 
Shah Suleman father's name was Abdullah who was a follower of Shah Maroof Khushabi. His mother's name was Bhaag Bhari. Suleman was born on 9th Rabi ul Awal 1508. His family lineage belongs to Quraysh

He was educated by his parents.

He received his spiritual teachings from Shah Maroof Khushabi. The recorded story is that Shah Maroof used to visit Abdullah's house. One day Shah Maroof Khushabi visited Shah Suleman's house. At that time Shah Suleman was 4 years old. Shah Suleman was playing in the front yard. He identified Suleman as his successor and the cause for which he was sent to the town. He called Suleman and kissed his forehead. He then asked his father to keep the boy safe as he would be his entrustment.

Shah Suleman had two wives: Romal Khatun and Jaurana Khatun, and two sons: Raheem Dad and Taj Mehmood.

Spiritual lineage 
He belonged to the lineage Silsila e Qadriyya as below:

 Muhammad
 Ali
 Hasan al-Basri
 Habib al-Ajami
 Dawud Tai
 Maruf Karkhi
 Sirri Saqti
 Junayd of Baghdad
 Abu Bakr Shibli
 Abdul Aziz bin Hars bin Asad Yemeni Tamimi
 Abu Al Fazal Abdul Wahid Yemeni Tamimi
 Mohammad Yousuf Abu al-Farah Tartusi
 Abul Hasan Hankari
 Abu Saeed Mubarak Makhzoomi
 Abdul Qadir Gilani
 Syed Abdul Wahab Gilani
 Syed Abdul Salam Gilani
 Syed Ahmad Gilani
 Syed Masood Gilani
 Syed Ali Gilani
 Syed Shahmeer Gilani
 Shams Uddin Gilani
 Shah Muhammad Ghoas Gilani
 Syed Mubarak Haqani Gilani Uch Sharif
Shah Maroof Farooqi Chisti Qadri
 Sakhi Shah Suleman Noori Hazoori

Travel and successor 
Shah Suleman Noori was ordered by his teacher (murshid) to travel to different places, so he travelled to Shahpur, Khushab, Chawa, Deowal, Jukali, Takht Hazaara, Kashmir and Gujrat, preaching Islam. Afterwards his teacher(murshid) ordered him to reside in Purana Bhalwal.

Due to his generosity he earned a honorific title "Sakhi".

He was succeeded by Muhammad Qadiri who founded the Qadria Naushahia silsila.

Death and shrine 

Shah Suleman Noori Hazoori died on the night of Friday the 27th Ramzan ul Mubaraik 1604 at the age of 96 years. His shrine in located in Purana Bhalwal. The large central grave is of Shah Suleman while the first grave on the right side is of his grandson Abdul Wahid. The 2nd grave on the right side is of his son Raheem Dad. On the left hand, the 1st grave is of his grandson Abdul Wahab while the 2nd grave is of his other son Taj Mahmood.

References 

Sufism in Pakistan
Qadiri order
Sufi literature